St Vincent Gardens in the Melbourne suburb of Albert Park, is an Australian park of national significance.

It is an example of nineteenth century residential development around a large landscaped square. Development occurred as a result of a boom following the Victorian gold rush. It was influenced by similar, urban design in London, but such design on such a scale is unparalleled in Australia.

In the shape of a large rectangular area with semi-circular crescents at either end, the heritage area includes the St Vincent Place precinct bounded by Park Street, Cecil Street, Bridport Street, Cardigan Place and Nelson Road. The park is bisected by Montague Street, allowing the passage of trams on route 1.  Several of the streets are lined with the original cobbled blue stone and gutters.  It is registered with the National Trust of Australia and on the Victorian Heritage register for its aesthetic, historical, architectural and social significance to the State of Victoria.

Significance

The gardens are particularly important according to the Victorian Heritage Register: 
as a reflection of the aspirations of middle class residents in South Melbourne. Because of the shared outlook on and use of the gardens, the precinct has developed a sense of community cohesion unusual in the Melbourne context. The gardens are also socially important as a focus of community life for the surrounding district with the maintenance of their amenity a priority of municipal government since their inception. The existence of the tennis and bowls clubs in the gardens for over a century is a further manifestation of this social importance.

The Australian Demographer Bernard Salt included the precinct as first among his "favourite places that have been designed by planners" :
 "St Vincent Place, Albert Park: Where would such a list start but in my home city of Melbourne? Surely this residential precinct known only to Melburnians must be one of this nation's town planning treasures.  Here are two extended but connecting crescents laid out around gardens which are overlooked by double-storey Victorian terrace houses. Designed in the early 1850s, St Vincent Place was virtually a gated community: the well-to-do would promenade around their public gardens; smaller wooden houses for servants and the working classes were relegated to the lesser enveloping crescents."

History

First design was probably by Andrew Clarke, the Surveyor-General of Victoria, in 1854 or 1855. Clement Hodgkinson adapted the design in 1857 to allow for its intersection by the St Kilda railway line, Melbourne.

Development of the gardens occurred during 1864–1870 with plans by Clement Hodgkinson in 1869 showing an overall plan of the reserve, including the older tree plantings, the path system at the western end and the circular theme of the paths design at the eastern end.

The Albert Park Bowls Club was established in the park in 1873.

The gardens were rejuvenated during 1903–1910 with much of the original landscaping being retained.

In 2004, a Canary Island Palm was removed suffering from fusarium wilt otherwise known as Panama Disease. In 2005 six significant trees were lost after a wild storm.

The improved appearance of the gardens over recent years has been due to local government projects completed in response to a Conservation Analysis & Management Strategy, by landscape architect Jill Orr-Young, Dec. 1997. The creation of mulched beds around significant trees has improved their condition and large herbaceous beds have been restored using heritage plant stock.  Further detailed historical investigations by Jill Orr-Young have led to the works described below. Reconstruction of the western half of the gardens' path network accurately plotted heritage alignments and used the original orange-coloured, granitic, sand surface and mild steel edging. This work included the installation of an on-site stormwater dissipation system, which now uses surface runoff to help irrigate lawn areas and minimise water usage.  The perimeter hedge around the gardens uses original Lonicera heritage plant stock sourced from Dame Elisabeth Murdoch's 'Cruden Farm.' This hedge will grow to a height of approximately 700mm.  The design of entry treatments for each of the entrances to the Gardens comprises bluestone walls and timber posts, with the new entrances designed to closely resemble the original appearance and layout of the old entrances. The northern and southern border beds have been planted with heritage plant stock in accordance with planting designs prepared by Jill Orr-Young.

Plantings and monuments 

Plantings include lines of Algerian Oak (Quercus canariensis)  and Canary Island Palms (Phoenix canariensis).

There are specimen plantings of:
 Brush cherry
 Coral Tree
 Lilly Pilly
 Moreton Bay fig
 Norfolk Island pine
 Peony
Southern magnolia (Magnolia grandiflora)
 Whitewillow

There is a monumental garden dedicated to the Australian entertainers Maurie Fields & his wife Val Jellay, former residents of the area.

The Charles Moore Memorial Drinking Fountain commemorates Charlie Moore, a Boer War soldier and Essendon Football Club full forward.  Moore was born 24 September 1875 in Fiji, married Rose Walters on 9 May 1898 at Fitzroy, Victoria (Vic reg 3227) and died 13 May 1901 at Doornbosch, South Africa.

The Alexander Rose Garden commemorates the contribution of Harold Alexander, Clerk of the City of South Melbourne from 1936 to 1964, who fostered municipal welfare services. Under his administration, Australia's first 'community chest' for social welfare was set up. After the war, be bought Nissen huts to provide hot meals to returned servicemen. They were the forerunners of today's senior citizens clubs.   Alexander appointed the council's first social worker and oversaw Australia's first meals on wheels service in 1953. He helped set up 'Claremont' aged care hostel. From 1927 he also fought to have Wirth's Circus site on Southbank reserved for the state's art gallery and cultural centre. He played for South Melbourne Football Club for five years.

Gallery

References

City of Port Phillip – St Vincent Gardens
Albert Park Bowls Club
Citation in the National Trust of Australia and Victorian Heritage Register.
Bernard Salt, "It's a gift when beauty goes according to plan", The Australian, Page 026, Thursday 6 July 2006
State Library Postcard (undated)
State Library Postcard of the Bowling Green (undated)
View of St. Vincent Gardens with St. Vincent Place, South Melbourne in background (1904–1932)

Heritage sites in Melbourne
Parks in Melbourne
Gardens in Victoria (Australia)
City of Port Phillip